Trintange is a small town in the commune of Waldbredimus, in south-eastern Luxembourg.  , the town has a population of 262.  It is the administrative centre of Waldbredimus commune.

Remich (canton)
Towns in Luxembourg